The Libertarian Party of Ohio (LPO) is the Ohio affiliate of the Libertarian Party. It is the fourth largest state affiliate of the Libertarian Party nationally and the third largest political party in Ohio.

History 
The Libertarian Party of Ohio (LPO) was the product of a women's project for limited government, organized in 1972 by Kay Harroff and fellow Randians of a chapter of Objectivists meeting regularly in Cleveland. In 1977, LPO member Elaine Lindsey won office as an independent to Circleville City Council. In 1982 LPO state chair Ann Leech achieved first ever ballot access with party brand. In its founding years, Ohio was a hotbed of Libertarian women activism. Over the years, a number of local candidates have been elected, while the Libertarian Party has been active in key issues, such as eminent domain.

In 2013, Todd Grayson was retained as City Council member for the northwest Ohio city of Perrysburg.  He was at the time and continues through 2016, the Vice Chairman of the Libertarian Party of Wood County.   He is the first registered Libertarian in Wood County to hold office.

In 2014, the Ohio Republican Party sought ways to have the LPO removed from the ballot.  This includes Republicans connected to then-Governor Kasich having a part in the partisan challenge of Charlie Earl's primary efforts.

On July 12, 2018, the LPO regained minor party status after submitting more than 60,000 signatures. This allowed the LPO to host primaries and lowered the required petition signatures for ballot access. To retain ballot access, the party's gubernatorial candidate was required to earn at least three percent of the vote in the Ohio gubernatorial election, 2018, which he failed to do.

Ballot access litigation 
The LPO has sued secretaries of state from both major parties and won. The first case, Libertarian Party of Ohio v. Blackwell  was decided in LPO's favor on September 6, 2006 and laid the legal framework for another victory on July 17, 2008 in Libertarian Party of Ohio v. Brunner.  These victories required the Ohio Secretary of State to list minor party political candidates with party affiliation on the ballot without the strict petitioning requirements of major parties.  In the 2008 presidential election this resulted in eight candidates on the ballot for president representing six political parties (along with two independents).

See also

 Charlie Earl
 Bill Peirce

References

External links 
 Libertarian Party of Ohio

Ohio
Political parties in Ohio